Adam John Kolarek (born January 14, 1989) is an American professional baseball pitcher in the Los Angeles Dodgers organization. He previously played for the Tampa Bay Rays, Los Angeles Dodgers and Oakland Athletics. He played college baseball for the Maryland Terrapins. Kolarek was drafted by the New York Mets in the 11th round of the 2010 Major League Baseball draft, and made his MLB debut in 2017. He was a member of  Team Israel in the 2023 World Baseball Classic in Miami in March 2023.

Amateur career
Kolarek was born in Baltimore, Maryland, to Frank Kolarek and Dorothy Kolarek. His father played baseball as a catcher at the University of Maryland from 1973-75, and then played professionally in the minor leagues for the Oakland Athletics organization from 1976-1979, reaching Class AA with the Ogden A's. He has three sisters.

He attended Catonsville High School. He was a pitcher and outfielder for the Comets. In 2006 as a junior he was named First-Team All-Metro as an outfielder. In 2007 as a senior he batted .397 and was 8-2 with a 1.05 ERA as a pitcher, and was named First-Team All-Metro as a pitcher and a Brooks Robinson All Star.

He then attended the University of Maryland, where he played from 2008 to 2010. In 2008 as a freshman, he was 2–1 with a 4.26 ERA in 21 relief appearances. In 2009 as a sophomore, he was 2–1 with a 4.68 ERA in 26 games (four starts), and in 2010 as a junior, he was 1–4 with a 6.06 ERA in 13 games (five starts). Ranked as one of the top 50 lefthanders in the country, Kolarek was drafted by the Mets in the 11th round of the 2010 Major League Baseball draft.

Professional career

New York Mets
Kolarek pitched for the Kingsport Mets and Brooklyn Cyclones in 2010, and went 2–1 with a 3.13 ERA in 22 relief appearances  between them. In 37 1/3 innings, he allowed 19 hits and had 45 strikeouts. Had he qualified, he would have led Kingsport in WHIP, with a mark of 0.643. 

He pitched for the Savannah Sand Gnats and St. Lucie Mets in 2011, going 7–1 with a 2.85 ERA in 26 games (one start). His 1.000 winning percentage for Savannah tied for the team and league lead.  

In 2012, Kolarek  went 1–3 with 18 saves (fifth in the league), 70 strikeouts (11.1 strikeouts per 9 innings; 6th in the league), and a 2.37 ERA in 44 games (57 innings) for St. Lucie, earning a spot on the Florida State League All-Star team. He also pitched 6 games for the Binghamton Mets, and posted a 2–0 record with a 5.68 ERA. He was an MiLB.com Organization All-Star and a FSL Post-Season All-Star that year. He led St. Lucie in games and games finished that year. He led the entire league in saves. In the Arizona Fall League, he had a 2.92 ERA in nine games for the Surprise Saguaros.  

In 2013, he was 3–3 with a 1.71 ERA in 44 relief appearances for Binghamton. In his first taste of Triple-A, Kolarek  had an 11.25 ERA in 2 appearances for the Las Vegas 51s as well.  

Kolarek spent some time with the big league club during 2014 spring training. Back with Binghamton for that year's regular season, his ERA was 6.07 in 48 relief appearances, though he had a 1.12 mark in six games for the Gigantes de Carolina in the Puerto Rican Winter League. 

He spent 2015 with Binghamton. He tied for fourth in the Eastern League with 51 appearances. He then pitched for the Gigantes de Carolina in the Puerto Rican League for a second consecutive year.

Baltimore Orioles
Kolarek signed a minor league contract with the Baltimore Orioles on October 23, 2015, and was assigned to the Double-A Bowie Baysox.

Tampa Bay Rays
On December 10, 2015, the Tampa Bay Rays selected Kolarek in the Triple-A phase of the Rule 5 draft. He split the 2016 season between the Triple-A Durham Bulls and the Double-A Montgomery Biscuits, posting a 3-4 record and 3.13 ERA in 47 appearances between the two teams, holding left-handers to limited lefties to a .143 average. On November 7, 2016, he elected free agency.

Atlanta Braves
On November 19, 2016, Kolarek signed a minor league contract with the Atlanta Braves organization that included an invitation to Spring Training. He did not make the team out of spring and was released on March 24, 2017.

Tampa Bay Rays (second stint)

On March 27, 2017, Kolarek signed a minor league contract to return to the Tampa Bay Rays organization. He was assigned to Triple-A Durham to begin the year. Kolarek was called up to the majors for the first time on June 28, 2017. At 28 years old, after 320 mionor league games over eight minor league seasons, Kolarek made his major league debut at PNC Park, throwing 1.1 innings, allowing one hit and striking out one on 14 pitches. On September 3, Kolarek was designated for assignment by Tampa Bay after struggling to a 6.48 ERA across 12 appearances in his rookie year. He was outrighted to Durham the next day. 

Kolarek did not make the team out of spring in 2018, and was assigned to Triple-A Durham to start the season. On July 6, 2018, Kolarek was selected to the active roster after posting a 1.70 ERA in 29 games in Durham. In 2018, he made 31 appearances with two saves and a 3.93 ERA, and 10.5 strikeouts per 9 innings. In 2019 with the Rays, he was 4–2 with a 3.95 ERA in 54 games.

Los Angeles Dodgers
On July 31, 2019, the Rays traded Kolarek to the Los Angeles Dodgers in exchange for minor leaguer Niko Hulsizer. He pitched in 26 games for the Dodgers in 2019, with two wins and a stellar 0.77 ERA in 11 innings.  In 2019 he allowed only 19.6% of inherited runners to score (the seventh-best percentage among Major League relievers), and had the 3rd-highest ground ball percentage among big league relievers, at 66.9%.

In the pandemic-shortened 2020 season, Kolarek was 3–0 with one save. He appeared in 20 games and allowed only two runs in 19 innings for an amazing 0.95 ERA. He held batters to a batting line of .164/.208/.224. He appeared in four games in the postseason, working  innings, allowing three runs as the Dodgers won the 2020 World Series. With the victory, Kolarek earned his first ever World Series championship.

Oakland Athletics
On February 12, 2021, Kolarek was traded to the Oakland Athletics (along with Cody Thomas) in return for Sheldon Neuse and Gus Varland. He was designated for assignment on June 30, 2022. On October 13, Kolarek elected free agency.

In his major league career through 2022, he kept left-handed batters to a batting line of .190/.243/.260.  Between 2017 and 2022, he primarily threw an 89 mph sinker and a 79 mph slider, while also throwing an 83 mph changeup and a 92 mph fourseam fastball.

Los Angeles Dodgers (second stint)
On December 15, 2022, Kolarek signed a minor league contract with the Dodgers.

International career; Team Israel 
Kolarek will be eligible to play for the Israel national baseball team in the 2023 World Baseball Classic, to be held starting in Miami during March 11–15, if it passes the first round. He would be playing for Team Israel manager Ian Kinsler, and alongside outfielder Joc Pederson and starting pitcher Dean Kremer, among others.

Personal
His father, Frank Kolarek, played in the minor leagues in the 1970s and 1980s. Adam married Melanie Rae Shapiro on November 11, 2017.

References

External links

1989 births
Living people
Baseball players from Baltimore
Major League Baseball pitchers
Tampa Bay Rays players
Los Angeles Dodgers players
Oakland Athletics players
Maryland Terrapins baseball players
University of Maryland, College Park alumni
Kingsport Mets players
Brooklyn Cyclones players
Savannah Sand Gnats players
St. Lucie Mets players
Binghamton Mets players
Surprise Saguaros players
Las Vegas 51s players
Gigantes de Carolina players
Montgomery Biscuits players
Durham Bulls players
Las Vegas Aviators players